Moretna Jeru (Amharic ሞረትና ጅሩ "Moret and Jeru") is one of the woredas in the Amhara Region of Ethiopia. It is named in part after the historic district of Shewa, Moret, which lay between the Jamma River and the district of Shewa Meda. Part of the Semien Shewa Zone, Moretna Jeru is bordered on the south by Siyadebrina Wayu, on the south west by Ensaro, on the northwest by Merhabiete, on the northeast by Menz Keya Gebreal, and on the east by Basona Werana. The administrative center of this woreda is Enewari; other towns in Moretna Jeru include Jihur.

Demographics
Based on the 2007 national census conducted by the Central Statistical Agency of Ethiopia (CSA), this woreda has a total population of 92,937, an increase of 20.34% over the 1994 census, of whom 47,611 are men and 45,326 women; 9,015 or 9.70% are urban inhabitants. With an area of 661.16 square kilometers, Moretna Jiru has a population density of 140.57, which is greater than the Zone average of 115.3 persons per square kilometer. A total of 21,281 households were counted in this woreda, resulting in an average of 4.37 persons to a household, and 20,283 housing units. The majority of the inhabitants practiced Ethiopian Orthodox Christianity, with 99.43% reporting that as their religion.

The 1994 national census reported a total population for this woreda of 77,226, of whom 39,045 were men and 38,181 were women; 7,240 or 9.38% of its population are urban dwellers. The largest ethnic group reported in Moretna Jiru was the Amhara (99.48%), and Amharic was spoken as a first language by 99.69%. The majority of the inhabitants practiced Ethiopian Orthodox Christianity, with 99.39% reporting that as their religion.

Notes

Districts of Amhara Region